Qeshlaq-e Eslamabad may refer to:
 Qeshlaq-e Eslamabad 2
 Qeshlaq-e Eslamabad 3

See also
 Eslamabad-e Qeshlaq